Monsheim is a Verbandsgemeinde ("collective municipality") in the district Alzey-Worms, Rhineland-Palatinate, Germany. The seat of the Verbandsgemeinde is in Monsheim.

The Verbandsgemeinde Monsheim consists of the following Ortsgemeinden

 Flörsheim-Dalsheim
 Hohen-Sülzen
 Mölsheim
 Monsheim
 Mörstadt
 Offstein
 Wachenheim

References 

Verbandsgemeinde in Rhineland-Palatinate